David Shub (1887 – 1973) was a social democrat arrested for activity in the 1905 Russian revolution and exiled to Siberia in 1906, and escaped to the United States in 1908.

In 1930 he wrote the lead article on Stalin, probably the first authoritative profile to appear in the American press, for the New York Times magazine (22 March 1930)

His 1948 biography of Lenin has been reprinted over sixteen times, described as "indispensable to the student of contemporary history, of russia, and of social revolution".

During his exile, he remained in close contact with leading figures of the Russian Revolutionary movement, including Bolsheviks Lenin, Trotsky, and Bukharin, and also liberals and socialists such as Kerensky, Miliukov, Chernov, Catherine Breshkovsky, and others.

Biography
David Shub was born and educated in Russia.  In 1904-1905 he lived in London, Paris, and Geneva, where he often met with leaders of the Social Democratic Party, both Menshevik and Bolshevik, including Lenin, Plekhanov, Axelrod, Zasulich, Bogdanov, Lunacharsky, Bonch-Bruyevich, Martov, Potresov, and Dan.

Biography of Lenin

Essentials of Leninism
As an appendix to his biography, Shub compiled a distillation of Leninist ideology in Lenin's own words.   Although he abhorred its ideology and praxis, Shub felt that Leninism was self-refuting.   The best way to undermine the project, therefore, was to allow Lenin to speak for himself.

Selected publications

Bibliography

References

External links
 David Shub, from the Jewish Virtual Library

1887 births
1973 deaths
Russian revolutionaries
Biographers
Mensheviks
Jews from the Russian Empire
Ukrainian Jews
Yiddish-language journalists
Emigrants from the Russian Empire to the United States